Friedrich Pinter (born 22 February 1978) is an Austrian former biathlete.

Life and career
Pinter announced his retirement after the 2015–16 season.

Biathlon results
All results are sourced from the International Biathlon Union.

Olympic Games

*The mixed relay was added as an event in 2014.

World Championships
1 medal (1 bronze)

*During Olympic seasons competitions are only held for those events not included in the Olympic program.

References

External links
 
 

1978 births
Living people
Sportspeople from Villach
Austrian male biathletes
Biathletes at the 2006 Winter Olympics
Biathletes at the 2014 Winter Olympics
Olympic biathletes of Austria
Biathlon World Championships medalists